John William Davis (September 12, 1916 – October 3, 1992) was an American politician and lawyer.

Early life and education
Davis was born near Rome, Georgia, attended the University of Georgia (UGA) in Athens and graduated in 1937 with an A.B. and from the UGA School of Law with a Bachelor of Laws (LL.B.) in 1939. He was admitted to the state bar in 1939 and began practice in Rome.

Career

WWII
Beginning in July 1942, Davis served in the United States War Department Headquarters until December 1945. He then served in South America on behalf of the Counter Intelligence Corps. In 1946, Davis moved to Summerville, Georgia, and resumed practicing law.

Political career
On December 27, 1950, Davis became solicitor general of the Rome Circuit and remained in that position until January 1, 1953. Two years later, he was elected judge of the Lookout Mountain Judicial Circuit, serving from January 1, 1955, until his resignation on December 31, 1960.

Time in Congress
In 1960, Davis won election to the 87th Congress as a Democrat representing Georgia's 7th congressional district.  He won re-election to six additional terms in that body until losing his 1974 re-election bid in that year's Democratic primary to conservative activist Larry McDonald. At the time of his loss, Davis had a drinking problem.   Davis served as a U.S. Representative from January 3, 1961 to January 3, 1975.

Davis' loss to McDonald in 1974 was attributed largely to his perceived lack of opposition to the concept of school busing, in which students were bused to schools outside of their district to facilitate desegregation.  Davis, who resided in the more rural part of his district, did not take into account the increasing political force of the northwest suburbs of Atlanta.  The fast-growing bedroom communities of Cobb County were filling up with residents who were fleeing mandatory desegregation in urban Atlanta; it was mainly these constituents who supported McDonald and his platform opposing interdistrict school busing. .

Later career and death
Davis returned to practicing law and lived in St. Simons Island, Georgia, at the time of his death on October 3, 1992.

References

External links

John William Davis Collection at the Richard B. Russell Library for Political Research and Studies libs.uga.edu

Georgia (U.S. state) lawyers
Georgia (U.S. state) state court judges
People from Brunswick, Georgia
People from Rome, Georgia
People from St. Simons, Georgia
Military personnel from Georgia (U.S. state)
University of Georgia alumni
1916 births
1992 deaths
History of racial segregation in the United States
Democratic Party members of the United States House of Representatives from Georgia (U.S. state)
Politicians from Athens, Georgia
People from Summerville, Georgia
20th-century American lawyers
20th-century American politicians
20th-century American judges